XXV Nonstop is the tenth album by American hardcore punk band Sick of It All and contains re-recorded classic songs and some new material. It was released on November 1, 2011 on Century Media Records.

Track listing

References

Sick of It All albums
Century Media Records compilation albums
2011 compilation albums